= Academic grading in Papua New Guinea =

In Papua New Guinea, the academic grading system scales from A (or First Class Honors) to D (or a Fail).

Grade description	Division	Grade
First Class Honors		A
Second Class Honors	Upper Division	A-/B+
Third Class Honors		B
Second Class Honors	Lower Division	B-
Pass		C
Fail		D
